Crenidens is a small genus of three species of seabream from the family Sparidae from the western Indian Ocean. It was previously regarded as monotypic, with the sole species being the Karenteen sea bream Crenidens crenidens but two other species are now accepted as valid species, separate from the type species, C. crenidens.

Species
Crenidens contains three recognised species. It was considered to be monotypic but a second and third species are now regarded as valid.

 Crenidens crenidens (Forsskål, 1775) (Karanteen seabream)
 Crenidens indicus Day, 1873
 Crenidens macracanthus Günther (1874 (Günther’s seabream)

References

Sparidae